Léopold Flameng (22 November 1831 – 5 September 1911) was a French engraver, illustrator and painter.

Biography
He was born in Brussels of French parents. His first artistic studies were with Luigi Calamatta and Jean Gigoux. His skill as engraver was noticed by Charles Blanc and his collaboration in the Gazette des Beaux-Arts with fellow engraver Léon Gaucherel helped ensure the publication's reputation. He eventually provided one hundred illustrations. He was a medallist at the Exposition Universelle (1878) and was elected a member of the Académie des Beaux-Arts in 1898.

Known for his etchings of works by Jan van Eyck, Leonardo da Vinci, Rembrandt, Ingres and Delacroix, he illustrated several books on Paris and numerous literary works of classical and contemporary authors, including Boccaccio, Paul Scarron, Victor Hugo and François Coppée.

He had numerous students, including his son, François Flameng as well as Richard Geiger, Frédéric Laguillermie, and Paul Rajon.

He was also the illustrator for the 1868 Revised edition of Picciola by X. B. Saintine, published after his death in 1865 in Courgent.

Gallery

External links
 
Images of works by Flameng in the New York Public Library.

1831 births
1911 deaths
19th-century engravers
20th-century engravers
French engravers
French illustrators
19th-century French painters
French male painters
20th-century French painters
20th-century French male artists
Artists from Brussels
20th-century French printmakers
19th-century French male artists